Mustamäe (Estonian for "Black Hill") is a subdistrict in the district of Mustamäe, Tallinn, the capital of Estonia. It has a population of 50,688.

Gallery

See also
TTÜ Sports Hall

References

Subdistricts of Tallinn